Leptobrachium huashen is a species of amphibian in the family Megophryidae. It is found in China, and possibly Laos and Myanmar. It is widespread in southwestern Yunnan province, China, where it is found in Jingdong, Tengchong, Luchun, Menglian, Mengyang, and Mengla counties.

Habitat
Its natural habitats are temperate forests and rivers. It is threatened by habitat loss.

References

huashen
Taxonomy articles created by Polbot
Amphibians described in 2005